St. Anthony is the name of more than one place in the U.S. state of Minnesota:
St. Anthony, Stearns County, Minnesota
St. Anthony, Hennepin County, Minnesota
St. Anthony, Minneapolis' old twin city along St. Anthony Falls

See also
Saint Anthony Park (Saint Paul), a neighborhood in Saint Paul, Minnesota
Nicollet Island/East Bank, Minneapolis, a neighborhood commonly known as Old Saint Anthony